DEAD (Asp-Glu-Ala-Asp) box polypeptide 27, also known as DDX27, is a human gene.

The protein encoded by this gene belongs to the family of DEAD box proteins, characterized by the conserved motif Asp-Glu-Ala-Asp (DEAD), and are putative RNA helicases. They are implicated in a number of cellular processes involving alteration of RNA secondary structure such as translation initiation, nuclear and mitochondrial splicing, and ribosome and spliceosome assembly. Based on their distribution patterns, some members of this family are believed to be involved in embryogenesis, spermatogenesis, and cellular growth and division. This gene encodes a DEAD box protein, the function of which has not been determined.

Model organisms

Model organisms have been used in the study of DDX27 function. A conditional knockout mouse line, called Ddx27tm1a(KOMP)Wtsi was generated as part of the International Knockout Mouse Consortium program, a high-throughput mutagenesis project to generate and distribute animal models of disease to interested scientists.

Male and female animals underwent a standardized phenotypic screen to determine the effects of deletion. Twenty seven tests were carried out and two phenotypes were reported. No homozygous mutant embryos were identified during gestation, and in a separate study only 1% survived until weaning (significantly less than the Mendelian ratio). The remaining tests were carried out on heterozygous mutant adult mice; no significant abnormalities were observed in these animals.

References

Further reading

Spliceosome
Genes mutated in mice